Pointing may refer to:

 Pointing, the hand gesture
 Pointing, a hand signal in the sport of pickleball indicating the ball is out
 Ostensive definition
 Pointing, the external part of the mortar between bricks in walling (see repointing)
 Pointing, the characteristic stance of pointing breeds of dogs used for hunting
 The position accuracy of the optical axis (boresight) of a directional antenna
 The process of adding vowel points to an abjad consonantal alphabet, such as niqqud in Hebrew and harakat in Arabic
 The process of distinguishing consonants with points, called dagesh in Hebrew and i'jam in Arabi
 In dated language, punctuation
 In sung psalmody, various methods of marking melodic inflections of Gregorian psalm tones and Anglican chants

See also
 Poynting (disambiguation)
 Point (disambiguation)
 Pointer (disambiguation)